Farms near Auvers or Thatched Cottages by a Hill is an oil painting by Vincent van Gogh that he painted in July 1890 when he lived in Auvers-sur-Oise, France.  The painting is an example of the double-square canvases that he employed in his last landscapes.

Van Gogh spent the last few months of his life in Auvers-sur-Oise, a small town just north of Paris, after he left an asylum at Saint-Rémy in May 1890.  Shortly after arriving at Auvers, Van Gogh wrote his sister Wil: "Here there are roofs of mossy thatch which are superb, and of which I’ll certainly do something." The painting appears to be unfinished. It is similar to Thatched Cottages and Houses, a painting thought to have been executed shortly after arrival at Auvers.

In 1933 the painting was bequeathed by C. Frank Stoop to the Tate Collection in London, though it is currently on loan to The National Gallery. It was painted the same month Van Gogh died.

See also
Auvers size 30 canvases
Cottages (Van Gogh series)
Double-square painting
Houses at Auvers
Impressionism
List of works by Vincent van Gogh
Peasant Character Studies (Van Gogh series)
Postimpressionism
Saint-Paul Asylum, Saint-Rémy (Van Gogh series)

References

External links

Paintings by Vincent van Gogh
Paintings of Auvers-sur-Oise by Vincent van Gogh
1890 paintings
Collection of the Tate galleries
Farming in art
Unfinished paintings